İslahiye station is a train station in İslahiye, Turkey. Situated on the former Baghdad Railway, it is the last station before the border with Syria. Before the outbreak of the Syrian Civil War, trains to Aleppo also used the station but have since been suspended. İslahiye station was built in 1912 by the Baghdad Railway.

References

Railway stations in Gaziantep Province
Buildings and structures in Gaziantep Province
Transport in Gaziantep Province
İslahiye District